Necromunda: Hired Gun is a 2021 first-person shooter video game developed by Streum On Studio and published by Focus Home Interactive. The game is based on Games Workshop's 1995 tabletop game Necromunda. The game is set in the Warhammer 40,000 universe, and takes place on the mechanized planet of Necromunda, where the player works for various factions in the planet's criminal underworld. Necromunda was released on 1 June 2021 for PlayStation 4, PlayStation 5, Xbox One, Xbox Series X and Series S and Microsoft Windows.

Gameplay 

Necromunda: Hired Gun is a first-person shooter, where the player plays as a  mercenary who is seeking to uncover a conspiracy involving a powerful gang in Necromunda's underworld. The game is linear, with stages that can be played through normally, later the player can take on contracts that require them to complete specific tasks in portions of the level. The player can choose between melee or ranged weapons, with upgrades available for each. The player can execute an enemy using a melee finisher if they're within a certain range. The game focuses on maintaining momentum, with the player able to use a grappling hook, dash around enemies and wall run. Hired Gun has platforming sections scattered throughout the game that require the use of these abilities. The game features stealth mechanics where the player can sneak past enemies to avoid detection. The player has a combat dog, which can be used to spot and attack enemies, and can be upgraded to improve its abilities and to gain new ones. The end of each level culminates in a boss fight.

The game has a central hub area, Martyr's End, where players gain access to levels and can pick out contracts. The hub serves as the area where much of the game's story and side quests exist. The player can also purchase weapons, abilities and upgrades at the shops around the area.

Plot

The game starts with the titular Hired Gun partnering up with two other bounty hunters to find a bounty dubbed the Silver Talon seeking refuge with the Escher gang. The Hired Gun’s partners are killed and they themselves are ambushed by the silver talon before being rescued by Kal Jericho, who has the Hired Gun implanted with a cranial cybernetic. Karl Jericho then sets the player out on the silver talon’s trail before tasking him with protection of a Guilder whom the underworld of Necromunda has placed a bounty on. Failing at the Guilder’s protection the Hired Gun tracks down the Silver Talon before being crossed for the last time.

Development 
After the launch of their previous title, Space Hulk: Deathwing, Streum On Studio wanted to return to the speed focused gameplay that their earlier title E.Y.E.: Divine Cybermancy was known for. A producer stated on the setting "Necromunda has a lot of diversity of environments, which allowed us to create various atmospheres and experiences for the players." The team used these environments to build levels with a mix of platforming and gunfights. The developers also mentioned that they wanted to make the player use their abilities to explore, so good loot was placed in hard to reach spots that the player needed good platforming skills to get to.

Martyr's End was designed with specific enemy placements in mind to "encourage the players to use their special moves" and to quickly allow players to clear enemies. The hub was designed to allow for story moments, and to give a player a break from the action focused gameplay. The game includes weapon customization, which the developers added in order to allow the player have more flexibility in how they approached combat. Hired Gun was designed to introduce players new to the franchise. Side contracts were added in order to allow more replay value.

The game was announced in March 2021 for a June 2021 launch. On 1 June 2021, Necromunda: Hired Gun was released on PlayStation 4, PlayStation 5, Xbox One, Xbox Series X and Series S and Microsoft Windows.

Reception 

Necromunda: Hired Gun received "mixed or average reviews" for the Windows, PlayStation 5 and Xbox Series X/S versions but received "generally unfavorable reviews" for the PlayStation 4 version, according to Metacritic.

VG247s Sherif Saed praised the game's combat, writing that "My desire to see what strange location the game was going to send me next kept me hooked on the main story thread, but it's the game's combat which made that journey exciting". He disliked how the game bound multiple actions to the same button, "Jumping into a wall, wall-running and jumping away all inexplicably use a single button. This finicky setup made it harder to pull off in the heat of combat than it needed to be, and stopped me from regularly mixing in wall-runs".

Sean Martin, writing for PCGamesN, felt the story was a mixed bag, "In general, Hired Gun's plot and dialogue is all over the shop. By the end of the game I couldn't even remember why I was hunting Silver Talon in the first place". Martin also felt the customization system was largely pointless, "It lacks a character and equipment menu, for instance, and its customisation options are mostly stat-based. It doesn't feel like you can change much of interest in your build".

IGNs reviewer for the game, Travis Northup was disappointed with the buggy state of the game, "You'll see yourself and others phase through the environment, slide around the level during melee animations before popping back into place, and even experience a hard crash or two... All of that really sucks the fun out of what should be a great time". Northup felt that the AI for enemies was poorly designed, as they ran straight at the player and didn't seem to make any interesting combat decisions. He also expressed disappointment with the story writing, "NPCs are equally shallow with precisely zero memorable characters or reasons to pay much attention to what's happening with the story".

References

External links
 

2021 video games
First-person shooters
Focus Entertainment games
PlayStation 4 games
PlayStation 5 games
Single-player video games
Streum On Studio games
Unreal Engine games
Video games developed in France
Video games featuring protagonists of selectable gender
Video games set in outer space
Video games set on fictional planets
Warhammer 40,000 video games
Windows games
Xbox One games
Xbox Series X and Series S games